The Prescot School is a coeducational secondary school located in Prescot, Merseyside, England. It was previously called Prescot Grammar School. It was announced in late 2015 by the headteacher, Judy Walker, that the historic name and the link to the school's near half-millennium of tradition (which had been deprecated between 2009-2015 by the local authority) was being restored as a consequence of a successful application by the school for academy status. The official opening of the reformed school was on 28 April.

The main historical source is local historian F. A. Bailey's 40 page pamphlet published to celebrate the 400th anniversary of the school in 1944 and reissued in 1971 under the title PGS 1544 - 1971 with postscripts by G. Dixon and the then headmaster, J. C. S. Weekes.

History

Foundation
The school was founded in 1544 by Gilbert Lathum, a local clergyman (later Archdeacon of Man) who left £140 in his will to fund a schoolmaster (at a stipend of £7 per year) to run a free grammar school.

The school was first based in Church Street, opposite the Prescot Parish Church of St. Mary's. It then moved in 1760 to a site in High Street, where it remained until 1924. The next move was to the spacious site on St. Helens Road, accommodated in newly built wooden buildings which were originally intended to be temporary, but were expanded and augmented in the 1960s by a brick-built assembly hall ("Spencer Briggs Hall"), classrooms and purpose-built metalwork and woodwork workshops, and remained in use until 1978 when they fell victim to an arson attack by a disturbed former pupil.

Famous headteachers include C. W. H. Richardson, who ensured its survival during difficult times in the 1920s and 1930s, and R. Spencer Briggs from 1937 to 1963.

Geoffrey Dixon was a stalwart of the 20th century and taught at the school for 42 years from 1927 to 1969, reaching the position of deputy headmaster.

By 1944, when the Butler Education Act brought the school into the free national system, the school was in fact charging tuition fees. At this point, entry criteria passed from the ability to pay to the ability to pass the 11+ exam.

From the 1930s to the 1960s the school expanded under the leadership of headmaster R. Spencer Briggs to a peak of 650 boys. Briggs modelled his school superficially on the British public school model, with a 'house' system, prefects, school uniform, a heavy emphasis on games (particularly football and cricket), and indeed corporal punishment. There was also rich extracurricular activity: debating, amateur dramatics, choral and instrumental music, and a plethora of school societies. During this period the school applied for and was granted its coat of arms. The Latin motto "Futuram civitatem inquirimus" translates as "Seeking society's future". In other words: "Looking forward".

Becoming comprehensive and co-educational (merger with the Girls' Grammar)
In 1975, it became part of the newly formed Metropolitan Borough of Knowsley, and joined with Prescot Grammar School for Girls (founded 1955) to become Prescot School. The school moved to the girls' school site as a result of two arson incidents at the Boys' School site in St. Helens Road. The extensive playing fields of the boys' school in St Helens Road were sold off and are now covered by a housing development.

In 2000 Prescot School gained specialist status as a Language College.

Merger with Higher Side
With funding from the Labour government's Building Schools for the Future initiative, the school was rebuilt, In September 2009 it merged with Higher Side School in Whiston to become officially named "Knowsley Park Centre for Learning, Serving Prescot, Whiston and the Wider Community" in 2009, listing as a compromise all the schools and communities merged into it. The name lasted seven years before its headmistress, who called the name "so embarrassing" cut it to simply "Prescot School" in 2016.

Notable alumni
 Gill Burns MBE, former English Ladies Rugby Captain
 Paul Lewis, classical pianist, soloist at the 2005 Last Night of the Proms
 Dave McCabe, The Zutons lead singer
 Colin Vearncombe, singer songwriter formerly known as the artist Black
 Rob Vincent, former professional footballer for D.C. United, in MLS

Prescot Grammar School (both schools)

 Alan A'Court, England and Liverpool FC footballer
 Jack Aspinwall, Conservative MP for Kingswood from 1979 to 1983 and for Wansdyke from 1983 to 1997
 Dave Bamber, Blackpool, Coventry City footballer
 Alan George Bamford CBE, Principal of Homerton College, Cambridge from 1985 to 1991
 Paul Blinkhorn, archaeologist, pottery expert and TV personality on programmes BBC Time Team, and Channel 5 Pub Dig
 Prof Sir Mike Brady, BP Professor of Information Engineering at the University of Oxford
 The Right Honourable Lord Burrows, Justice of the Supreme Court of the United Kingdom since 2020, formerly Professor of the Law of England at the University of Oxford
 Kenneth Crook CMG, Ambassador to Afghanistan from 1976 to 1979
 Nicholas Fazackerley, lawyer and MP for Preston in the years 1732-67
 Jacqueline Foster, Conservative MEP for North West England from 1999 to 2004 and 2009 to 2019
 Pete Griffiths, founding member and bassist of punk rock band The Spitfire Boys
 Tony Hazzard, songwriter, session singer and recording artiste
 Prof Graham Hough, Professor of English at the University of Cambridge from 1966 to 1975
 Sue Johnston, actress
 Prof Peter Lawrenson, award-winning electrical engineer, President from 1992 to 1993 of the Institution of Electrical Engineers
 Ian McIntyre, broadcaster and Controller of BBC Radio 4 from 1976 to 1978 and BBC Radio 3 from 1978 to 1987
 Keith Macklin, sports broadcaster and journalist
 Geoff Nulty, Everton FC footballer
 John Edward Parkinson, Professor of Law at Bristol University and promulgator of the concept of stakeholders in corporate law
 Laurence Perkins, principal bassoonist in Manchester Camerata
 John David Pugh, Lib Dem MP for Southport since 2001
 Nigel Roberts, computer scientist 
 Stuart Sutcliffe, bassist for the Beatles for two years
 Sir George Sweeney, former principal of Knowsley Community College; knighted in 2000
 Rt Rev John Waine, former Bishop of Chelmsford from 1986 to 1996
 Prof Sid Watkins, neurosurgeon and Formula One medical advisor

References

External links
 Prescot School
 The Prescotian
 Prescot Roll of Honour

1544 establishments in England
Educational institutions established in the 1540s
Secondary schools in the Metropolitan Borough of Knowsley
Academies in the Metropolitan Borough of Knowsley